The Matheniko Wildlife Reserve is a conservation area in the Karamoja subregion of northeastern Uganda. It is the fifth most-threatened conservation protected area in Uganda.

Location
Matheniko is a part of the corridor of protected areas in Karamoja that stretches from Kidepo National Park down through Bokora and Pian Upe Wildlife Reserves. The Reserve's northeastern boundary is also the Uganda-Kenya border.

History

Geology

Climate
Matheniko falls into the Somalia-Masai ecoregion of semi-desert grassland and shrubland.

Biology
a good type of vegetation is found here

Tourism
The Uganda Wildlife Authority is actively working to develop Matheniko's tourism infrastructure. As of February 2012 it seeking bidders to construct a six roomed Guest House there.

References

Wildlife sanctuaries of Uganda
Northern Acacia-Commiphora bushlands and thickets